"Det svär jag på" is a song written by Lena Philipsson and Torgny Söderberg, and performed by Arvingarna at Melodifestivalen 1999, where it ended up third. It was also released as a single. The song was originally thought to have been performed by Lena Philipsson herself.

At the Swedish singles chart it peaked at number 39. The song also charted at Svensktoppen for four weeks between 10 April-15 May 1999, peaking at fourth position before getting knocked out of chart.

Charts

References

1999 singles
1999 songs
Arvingarna songs
Melodifestivalen songs of 1999
Songs written by Torgny Söderberg
Swedish-language songs